Kalateh-ye Najaf (also Romanized as Kalāteh-ye Najaf; also known as Kalāteh-ye Najafābād) is a village in Doruneh Rural District, Anabad District, Bardaskan County, Razavi Khorasan Province, in Northeast Iran. At the 2006 census, its population was 31, in 8 families.

References 

Populated places in Bardaskan County